Sophia Hunter (born 9 December 1964) is a Jamaican hurdler. She competed in the women's 100 metres hurdles at the 1984 Summer Olympics.

References

External links
 

1964 births
Living people
Athletes (track and field) at the 1984 Summer Olympics
Jamaican female hurdlers
American female hurdlers
Olympic athletes of Jamaica
Place of birth missing (living people)
21st-century American women
Universiade medalists in athletics (track and field)
Universiade bronze medalists for the United States